Major-General Thomas Victor Anderson DSO, CD (July 4, 1881 – November 8, 1972) was a Canadian soldier and Chief of the General Staff, the head of the Canadian Army from 21 November 1938 until 6 July 1940.

Education
Born in Ottawa, Ontario, Thomas Victor Anderson graduated from the Royal Military College of Canada in Kingston, Ontario in 1900, student # 433. He was commissioned as a Lieutenant in 1905 and promoted to Captain in 1910 and to Major in 1913.

Service
Anderson served in World War I as Commander Royal Canadian Engineers for 3rd Canadian Division on the Western Front. He was mentioned in despatches four times and awarded the DSO in 1918. He was further awarded with the Russian Order of St Anne, 2nd class, with swords, the 1914–1915 Star, British War Medal and Victory Medal, finishing the war as a brevet Colonel.

After the War he became an instructor at the Royal Military College of Canada. In 1925 he was promoted to Lieutenant-Colonel and appointed Director of Military Training & Staff Duties at National Defence Headquarters. Promoted to Colonel in 1929, he became the District Officer Commanding 10th Military District and in 1933 he was made District Officer Commanding 2nd Military District. His next post was as Quartermaster-General in 1935. He was promoted to Major-General in 1936 and selected to be Chief of the General Staff in 1938.

He served, during World War II, as the Inspector-General of Central Canada from 1940 and retired in 1943.

References

Further reading
4237 Dr. Adrian Preston & Peter Dennis (Edited) "Swords and Covenants" Rowman And Littlefield, London. Croom Helm. 1976.
H16511 Dr. Richard Arthur Preston "To Serve Canada: A History of the Royal Military College of Canada" 1997 Toronto, University of Toronto Press, 1969.
H16511 Dr. Richard Arthur Preston "Canada's RMC – A History of Royal Military College" Second Edition 1982
H1877 R. Guy C. Smith (editor) "As You Were! Ex-Cadets Remember". In 2 Volumes. Volume I: 1876–1918. Volume II: 1919–1984. Royal Military College. [Kingston]. The R.M.C. Club of Canada. 1984

Canadian Anglicans
Military personnel from Ottawa
Canadian Companions of the Distinguished Service Order
1881 births
1972 deaths
Royal Military College of Canada alumni
Canadian Expeditionary Force officers
Canadian military personnel of World War I
Canadian military personnel of World War II
Canadian Army generals of World War II
Graduates of the Staff College, Camberley
Academic staff of the Royal Military College of Canada
Royal Canadian Engineers officers
Commanders of the Canadian Army
Canadian generals

Canadian Militia officers